A "Heritage fleet" is a collection of historic vehicles or vessels.

Heritage Fleet may also refer to:

 Heritage Fleet, a type of rolling stock operated by Amtrak, the American railroad company
 Union Pacific Heritage Fleet, a fleet of historic steam and diesel locomotives operated by the Union Pacific Railroad in USA
 The Heritage Fleet, a British company operating preserved buses
 Norfolk Heritage Fleet Trust, a maritime charity based in Norfolk, England
 Sydney Heritage Fleet, sailing vessels and maritime museum in Sydney, Australia
 Classes 100 to 131 of the List of British Rail diesel multiple unit classes in the fleet numbering scheme of the former nationalised British railway operator